The 1996 EHF European Women's Handball Championship was held in Denmark from 6–15 December. It was won by Denmark after beating Norway 25–23 in the final match.

Venues
The European Championship was held in the following cities:
Brøndby
Vejle
Fredericia
Herning

Teams

Squads

Preliminary round

Group A

Group B

classification matches

Eleventh place game

Ninth place game

Seventh place game

Fifth place game

Final round

Semifinals

Bronze medal match

Gold medal match

Final ranking

European Women's Handball Championship
H
H
Women's handball in Denmark
European Women's Handball Championship
European Women's Handball Championship
Sport in Herning
Brøndby Municipality